Cocu is a commune in Argeș County, Muntenia, Romania. It is composed of eight villages: Bărbătești, Cocu, Crucișoara, Făcălețești, Greabănu, Popești, Răchițele de Jos (the commune centre), and Răchițele de Sus.

The commune lies in the Wallachian Plain, on the banks of the river Cotmeana. It is located in the western part of Argeș County,  from the county seat, Pitești.

Natives
 Constantin Doncea (1904–1973), communist activist and politician

References

Communes in Argeș County
Localities in Muntenia